Modern Romance is a 1981 American comedy romance film directed by and starring Albert Brooks, who also co-wrote the script with Monica Mcgowan Johnson. It co-stars Kathryn Harrold and Bruno Kirby.

Plot
Robert Cole (Albert Brooks) is a Hollywood film editor right in the middle of cutting a new science fiction film featuring George Kennedy. His relationship with very patient bank executive Mary Harvard (Kathryn Harrold) is caught between undying devotion and endless agony. It's all because selfish Robert is a bit of a self-involved neurotic who can't quite decide if their relationship is meant to be, mainly because he's not sure if she's the one or there's someone else.

Robert breaks off their relationship only to find that modern romance isn't as easy as it seems, and the people you love might be the ones you constantly hurt the most. He and Mary end up driving to a cabin in Idyllwild, California, where intense jealousy causes Robert to alternately accuse and annoy Mary and propose marriage to her.

Cast
 Albert Brooks as Robert Cole 
 Kathryn Harrold as Mary Harvard 
 Bruno Kirby as Jay
 James L. Brooks as David
 George Kennedy as Himself; Zoron
 Albert Henderson as Head Mixer

Production
Bruno Kirby co-stars as Jay, Robert's co-worker and confidant, and Brooks' brother Bob Einstein, best known as hapless daredevil Super Dave Osborne, plays a pushy salesman at a sporting goods store.

A third brother, Cliff, has a cameo in the scenes set in the recording studio. He plays the music mixer, the bald man sitting to the left of the head mixer, who gets up and goes to his car during the break.

David, the director of the film that Robert is editing, is played by real-life film director James L. Brooks – no relation to Albert. He would later return the favor by casting Albert in his Academy Award-nominated role of Aaron Altman in Broadcast News.

According to Albert Brooks, Stanley Kubrick was a big fan of the film.  He tells the story that Kubrick called him after viewing the film and asked, "How did you make this movie? I've always wanted to make a movie about jealousy."

Reception
The film holds an 82% rating on Rotten Tomatoes based on 22 reviews. The site's critical consensus states: "Modern Romance contains all the hallmarks of Albert Brooks' best work: darkly funny, confrontational, and chock full of pithy observations about human behavior."

References

External links
 
 
 

1981 films
1981 comedy films
American comedy films
Films about filmmaking
Films directed by Albert Brooks
Films set in California
Films with screenplays by Albert Brooks
Films with screenplays by Monica Johnson
Columbia Pictures films
1980s English-language films
1980s American films